Satronia is a New World genus of tortrix moths belonging to the subfamily Olethreutinae and tribe Grapholitini. The genus was erected in 1926 by Carl Heinrich and was previously considered monotypic. Its type species is Satronia tantilla.

Appearance
Józef Razowski and Vitor O. Becker (2016) described the genus as

Distribution
Species from this genus are known to occur in Florida, Costa Rica, and Brazil. Specimens have been collected at altitudes ranging from 5 to 1100 meter.

Species
The genus consists of the following thirteen species, listed alphabetically:
Satronia catharma Razowski & Becker, 2016
Satronia herediae Razowski, 2011
Satronia laepha Razowski & Becker, 2016
Satronia lita Razowski & Becker, 2016
Satronia mantissa Razowski & Becker, 2016
Satronia mesaea Razowski & Becker, 2016
Satronia pentha Razowski & Becker, 2016
Satronia pheidologeton Razowski & Becker, 2016
Satronia priva Razowski & Becker, 2016
Satronia selvae Razowski, 2011
Satronia sesops Razowski & Becker, 2016
Satronia sinuata Razowski & Becker, 2016
Satronia tantilla Heinrich, 1926

See also
List of Tortricidae genera

References

External links

Tortricidae genera
Grapholitini